WJNX (1330 AM) is a radio station broadcasting a Spanish News/Talk format. Licensed to Fort Pierce, Florida, United States, the station is currently owned by Port St. Lucie Broadcasters, Inc.

History
The station signed on as WARN on December 24, 1952, as an ABC affiliate. It was the second station to serve Fort Pierce following WIRA.

References

External links

JNX
Fort Pierce, Florida
Radio stations established in 1987
1987 establishments in Florida